Virginia Square is a neighborhood in Arlington County, Virginia. It is centered at the Virginia Square station on the Orange and Silver lines of the Washington Metro subway system, between Clarendon and Ballston. The neighborhood consists of a mix of high-rise apartments, garden apartments, and single-family homes generally dating back to the 1930s.

The Virginia Square neighborhood is home to the Arlington campus of George Mason University including its Law School, the Arlington Arts Center, some offices of the Federal Deposit Insurance Corporation (FDIC), and the main branch of the Arlington Public Library. The area's name is derived from the former Virginia Square Shopping Center (now occupied mainly by a major satellite office of the FDIC with a Giant supermarket on part of the property). Among local restaurants, Mario's Pizza has been a landmark since 1957 and El Pollo Rico since 1988.

References

External links
Virginia Square Metro Station Area Data, Statistics and Development
Arlington's Urban Villages - Virginia Square
Arlington Arts Center

Neighborhoods in Arlington County, Virginia
Transit-oriented developments in the United States